Death's Ride is a 1984 adventure module for the Dungeons & Dragons roleplaying game. Its associated code is CM2. The module was designed by Garry Spiegle, with cover and interior art by Jeff Easley.

Plot summary
Death's Ride is an adventure scenario in which the player characters investigate a barony in a distant location has cut off communications, and they encounter a wizard's tower and a village which under control of undead creatures.

A strange black cloud hangs over the Norworld barony of Two Lake Vale, which is cut off from the rest of the world. As the player characters move to investigate, they encounter armies of the living dead and other vile creatures besieging the last pockets of human resistance. The only relief is to find and destroy the dreadful Deathstone, which is responsible for the black cloud, thereby facing the united forces of an evil sorcerer, a powerful priest, and a mighty dragon.

Publication history
CM2 Death's Ride was written by Garry Spiegle, with art by Jeff Easley, and was published by TSR in 1984 as a 32-page booklet with an outer folder.

Reception
Lawrence Schick, in his 1991 book Heroic Worlds, calls the module's cover "Striking".

See also
 List of Dungeons & Dragons modules

References

External links
 Death's Ride entry from Pen-paper.net
 The "CM" modules from The Acaeum

Dungeons & Dragons modules
Mystara
Role-playing game supplements introduced in 1984